Ngereklmadel is a town in the state of Ngatpang in Palau.

References

Ngatpang